The 1935 UCI Track Cycling World Championships were the World Championship for track cycling. They took place in Brussels, Belgium from 10 to 18 August 1935. Three events for men were contested, two for professionals and one for amateurs.

Medal summary

Medal table

See also
 1935 UCI Road World Championships

References

Track cycling
UCI Track Cycling World Championships by year
International cycle races hosted by Belgium
Sports competitions in Brussels
1935 in track cycling
August 1935 sports events
1930s in Brussels